Blue Creek may refer to:

Blue Creek Conservation Area, a conservation area in Whitehouse, Ohio 
Blue Creek Rainforest Preserve, a small rainforest nature preserve in southern Belize
Blue Creek Township, Adams County, Indiana
Blue Creek Township, Paulding County, Ohio
Blue Creek (Belize),  a river in Belize
Blue Creek, Toledo, a village in Toledo District, Belize
Blue Creek (California)
Blue Creek (Michigan)
Blue Creek (Conrad Creek tributary), a stream in Missouri
Blue Creek, Ohio
Blue Creek, Utah, a ghost town in Box Elder County, Utah, United States
Blue Creek Valley, the site of Blue Creek, Utah
Blue Creek (Chattahoochee River), a tributary of the Chattahoochee River in Georgia
Blue Creek (West Virginia)
Blue Creek (Gunnison River tributary), a stream in Colorado
Blue Creek (Owyhee River tributary), a stream in Idaho